Bereskletovskogo Khozyaystva (Böresklet xujalığı) is a rural locality (a village) in Verkhnebishindinsky Selsoviet, Tuymazinsky District, Bashkortostan, Russia. The population was 15 as of 2010. There is 1 street.

Geography 
Bereskletovskogo Khozyaystva is located 26 km south of Tuymazy (the district's administrative centre) by road. Imangulovo is the nearest rural locality.

References 

Rural localities in Tuymazinsky District